Güray Kanan (born 1 April 1971) is a former Turkish professional basketball player. He played for Turkey national basketball team and member of Fenerbahçe's first Turkish Basketball League championship squad.

He was married with Pinar Yapicilar in Instabul, Turkey. They have one daughter, Deniz Kanan, who currently studies art in the United Kingdom. She was born in Ankara and was a competitive equestrian show jumper. The family currently lives in Antalya and has many business ventures. They own two restaurants, The Big Man, in Antalya.

References

External links
TBLStat.net Profile
Profile at TurkSports.net

1971 births
Living people
Turkish men's basketball players
Fenerbahçe men's basketball players
Darüşşafaka Basketbol players
Oyak Renault basketball players
İstanbul Teknik Üniversitesi B.K. players
Forwards (basketball)